"Charmer" is a song by English band Strawbs featured on their 1976 album Deep Cuts.

The song was written by Dave Cousins and Chas Cronk. The single version has some additional overdubs compared to the version on the album.

Release history

B-Side of the single

The B-side track "Beside the Rio Grande" is a Dave Cousins composition also appearing on the album. The lyrics recount a  story of the unjust lynching of a preacher, in the American Wild West.

Personnel

Dave Cousins – lead vocals, acoustic guitar
Dave Lambert – electric guitar, backing vocals
Chas Cronk – bass guitar, backing vocals
Rod Coombes – drums

with

Robert Kirby – mellotron
John Mealing – keyboards
Rupert Holmes - keyboards

Mellotron can clearly be heard on this track, therefore according to the album credits Robert Kirby is playing on this track. Both the other keyboard players are credited on the album but it is unsure which of them played on this particular track. A synthesizer can be  heard in the instrumentation but both Mealing and Holmes are credited with this instrument in the album credits.

References
"Charmer" at Strawbsweb
Liner notes to Road Goes on Forever CD RGF/WCDCD 027 Deep Cuts/Burning for You

External links
Lyrics to "Charmer" at Strawbsweb
Lyrics to "Beside the Rio Grande" at Strawbsweb

1976 singles
Strawbs songs
1976 songs
Songs written by Dave Cousins
Songs written by Chas Cronk